The Towson Tigers women's lacrosse team is an NCAA Division I college lacrosse team representing Towson University as part of the Colonial Athletic Association. They play their home games at Johnny Unitas Stadium in Towson, Maryland.

Individual career records

Reference:

Individual single-season records

Seasons

Postseason Results

The Tigers have appeared in 10 NCAA tournaments. Their postseason record is 2-10.

References

 
College women's lacrosse teams in the United States
Women's sports in Maryland